James "Jimmy The Jet" Cunningham (born January 1, 1973) is a former return specialist and wide receiver in the Canadian Football League and the XFL.

References

External links
Just Sports Stats
CFLapedia bio

1973 births
Living people
African-American players of Canadian football
American football return specialists
American football wide receivers
BC Lions players
Canadian football return specialists
Canadian football wide receivers
Howard Bison football players
Players of American football from Houston
Players of Canadian football from Houston
Sportspeople from Houston
San Francisco Demons players
Toronto Argonauts players
21st-century African-American sportspeople
20th-century African-American sportspeople